is a district located in Ehime Prefecture, Japan.

As of 2004, the estimated population is 11,222 with a total area of 583.66 km2.

It consists of one town.

Kumakōgen

History
Due to 1878 Land Reforms, the district was created after the breakup of Ukena District. (24 villages)
1889
The villages of Kamigawa, Nakagawa, and Hongawa merged to become the village of Sangawa.  (22 villages)
The villages of Ōhira, Hinokawa, Machi, and Tera merged to become the village of Odamachi.  (19 villages)
The villages of Tateishi and Nanzan merged to become the village of Ishiyama.  (18 villages)
The villages of Yoshinokawa, Nakatado, Kamitado, and Usuki merged to become the village of Tado.  (17 villages)
August 20, 1900 — The village of Kumamachi gained town status to become the town of Kuma.  (1 town, 14 villages)
February 11, 1924 — The village of Sugō merged into the town of Kuma.  (1 town, 13 villages)
January 1, 1934 — The village of Somagawa was renamed to the village of Omogo.
April 1, 1943
The village of Ishiyama merged into the village of Odamachi.  (1 town, 12 villages)
Parts of the village of Ukena merged into the village of Sōgawa in the Higashiuwa District.
Parts of the village of Ukena merged with the villages of Kawabe, Ōtani, and Uwakawa from Kita District to form the village of Hijikawa in Kita District (now the city of Ōzu).  (1 town 11 villages)
September 1, 1943 — The village of Myōjin merged into the town of Kuma.  (1 town, 10 villages)
March 31, 1955
Parts of the village of Nakatsu merged into the village of Yanadani.
The villages of Hirokata, Shinagawa, and parts of Nakatsu merged to become the village of Mikawa.  (1 town, 8 villages)
The villages of Tado, Sangawa, and Odamachi merged to become the town of Oda.  (2 towns, 5 villages)
March 31, 1959 — The villages of Kawase, Fujimine, and parts of the village of Mikawa merged into the town of Kuma.  (2 towns, 3 villages)
August 1, 2004 — The town of Kuma, and the villages of Mikawa, Omogo and Yanadani merged to form the new town of Kumakōgen.  (2 towns)
January 1, 2005 — The town of Oda, and the town of Ikazaki, from Kita District, merged into the expanded town of Uchiko in Kita District.  (1 town)

Kamiukena District